US keyboard layout may refer to:

 QWERTY, the traditional keyboard layout
Dvorak, an alternative layout made to make typing easier, sometimes called the American Simplified Keyboard